Corey R. Lewandowski (born September 18, 1973) is an American political operative, lobbyist, political commentator and author who is politically associated primarily with Donald Trump.  He was the first campaign manager of Trump's 2016 presidential campaign and fired by Trump during the Republican Primary. He later became a political commentator for One America News Network (OANN), Fox News and CNN. 

Before convincing Trump he could lead his campaign, Lewandowski worked on several campaigns, for a Congressman, worked for the conservative advocacy group Americans for Prosperity and was a lobbyist.

He also held the position of Seasonal Marine Patrol Officer Trainee for approximately 3.5 years and successfully graduated the New Hampshire part-time Police Officer Academy. Lewandowski himself has run unsuccessfully for office twice, once in Massachusetts and once in New Hampshire. On December 21, 2016, Lewandowski co-founded Avenue Strategies, a lobbying firm in an office near the White House. He left the firm in May 2017.

On August 1, 2019, Lewandowski announced that he was "very seriously" considering seeking the Republican nomination to oppose incumbent Democratic Senator Jeanne Shaheen in the 2020 United States Senate election in New Hampshire. In January 2020, he ultimately decided not to run, while stating that he "would have won" had he run.

On the day it was reported in September 2021 that he had made sexual advances toward a major Trump donor, a Trump spokesman said Lewandowski "will no longer be associated with Trump World."

Early life and education
Lewandowski was raised in Lowell, Massachusetts. One of his grandfathers was a printer. He is of Polish and French-Canadian descent. Lewandowski graduated in 1991 from Lowell Catholic High School, a private, not-for-profit, college-preparatory school in Lowell.

In 1995, he graduated from the University of Massachusetts Lowell with a B.A. in political science. He received a master's degree in political science from American University in Washington, DC, in 1997.

Political career

1994 Massachusetts State House campaign
In 1994, while an undergraduate student, Lewandowski ran for a seat in the Massachusetts House of Representatives as a write-in candidate in the Republican primary. He received 143 votes, falling short of the 150 votes needed to win the party's nomination for the ballot. In the November general election, the seat was won by Thomas A. Golden Jr., a Democrat. Golden received 7,157 votes, while Lewandowski received 7 votes.

Early work
After graduating from college, Lewandowski worked as an aide for Republican Massachusetts Congressman Peter G. Torkildsen from January 1996 to January 1997, while a graduate student at American University. Also while a student in 1997, Lewandowski interned for Massachusetts State Senator Steven C. Panagiotakos, a Democrat.

From December 1997 to February 2001, Lewandowski worked as an administrative assistant for Ohio Republican Bob Ney, a U.S. Congressman. In 2007, before Ney was sentenced on federal corruption charges arising from the Abramoff lobbying scandal, Lewandowski wrote a letter to the presiding judge, saying that Ney was a mentor and "surrogate father" to him and asking for leniency in sentencing.

In 1999, while working for Ney, Lewandowski brought a loaded handgun in a laundry bag into the Longworth House Office Building. He was arrested and charged with a misdemeanor. Lewandowski said it was an accident, that he forgot the gun was in the bag when he put the laundry in it. The charges eventually were dismissed; Lewandowski then unsuccessfully fought for four years to get the gun back, filing lawsuits in multiple District of Columbia and federal courts.

After leaving Ney's office, Lewandowski worked most of 2001 for the Republican National Committee as the Northeast legislative political director.

Smith campaign
Lewandowski was the campaign manager for the 2002 re-election campaign of U.S. Senator Robert C. Smith of New Hampshire. Smith was challenged in the Republican primary by John E. Sununu.

Speaking about Sununu, Lewandowski said, "The people of New Hampshire want someone in the U.S. Senate with clear, concise views on terrorism. They'll judge a congressman based on the people he associates with, his voting record and his campaign contributions." Lewandowski told a reporter he would be interested to know whether anyone associated with Hamas had attended a fundraising event for Sununu. (Lewandowski cited contributions made by Washington lawyer George Salem to Sununu; Salem, who chaired Arab Americans for Bush-Cheney during the 2000 Bush/Cheney campaign, was the attorney for the Holy Land Foundation for Relief and Development, which had its assets frozen by the U.S. government in 2001 on suspicion of ties to Hamas.) Lewandowski's comments were interpreted as publicly suggesting that Sununu, who is of Lebanese descent, had divided loyalties in fighting terrorism.

Former New Hampshire Governor Steve Merrill said, "The politics of ethnic slurs and bigotry have no place in any campaign." Former New Hampshire Senator Warren Rudman said, "Bob Smith is a better human being than that, and he ought to tell his people to watch themselves." President George W. Bush's spokesperson said, "The White House called Senator Smith's office ... Remarks that paint Arab Americans with a broad brush aren't helpful. We need to reassure Arab Americans that this war is about al-Qaida, not Islam. Mr. Salem is a good friend of the president's and an honorable man."

Smith's press secretary said Lewandowski was "merely responding to media inquiries" about Salem's fund raising and that "Senator Smith has repeatedly said this campaign is about records—Congressman Sununu's record and Senator Smith's record. Someone's ethnic background has absolutely nothing to do with this election."

Sununu defeated Smith in the Republican primary, winning 53% of the vote to Smith's 45%. Smith was the first sitting U.S. senator in ten years to lose a primary campaign.

Schwartz MSL, Americans for Prosperity, and other work
From 2003 to 2004, Lewandowski was executive director of the New England Seafood Producers Association.

From 2004 to 2012, Lewandowski worked for Schwartz MSL, a strategic communication and engagement firm where, according to his LinkedIn profile, he served as director of public affairs from September 2004 until July 2012. Lewandowski was registered as a lobbyist for Schwartz MSL on behalf of Passport Systems in 2011, lobbying on homeland security issues. Schwartz represented Passport Systems for six years, and the firm paid Schwartz more than $350,000 over that period. Between 2008 and 2011, Passport Systems secured more than $23.9 million in federal funds. Lewandowski represented two other clients: health care software company Logical Images and solar-power company Borrego Solar.

Lewandowski graduated from the New Hampshire police academy in 2006 and worked from 2006 to 2010 as a seasonal marine patrol officer trainee with the New Hampshire Division of Safety Services.

In 2008, Lewandowski began working for Americans for Prosperity, a Koch brothers-backed advocacy group. Lewandowski's period working for Americans for Prosperity overlapped with his tenure as a marine patrol officer trainee and registered federal lobbyist. Lewandowski was Americans for Prosperity's New Hampshire director, and East Coast regional director before becoming the national director of voter registration, a position he held until January 2015. Lewandowski's term at Americans for Prosperity was described by Politico as "tumultuous" and marked by "fiery confrontations" with other AFP employees.

While working for Americans for Prosperity, Lewandowski criticized the Regional Greenhouse Gas Initiative, a cap-and-trade system for state utilities, saying "it does nothing to reduce greenhouse gases because jobs and businesses just move to other states." At the same time, Lewandowski lobbied for Borrego Solar, helping to secure a $500,000 earmark in the 2010 Energy and Water Appropriations Act that benefited a solar electricity project in Lancaster, Massachusetts, that Borrego was involved in. Newsweek noted, "though he had succeeded as a pro-solar lobbyist looking for government assistance, at AFP he waged a campaign against government programs that supported green energy."

In 2012, while still working for Americans for Prosperity, Lewandowski unsuccessfully ran for town treasurer of Windham, New Hampshire. NPR reported that during the campaign, Lewandowski "upended the town's politics, using public records laws to probe local government and launching robocalls targeted at voters to stoke outrage over a visit to the town by President Obama." Robert Skinner defeated Lewandowski, receiving 1,941 votes to Lewandowski's 714.

Trump 2016 presidential campaign
Lewandowski first met Trump in April 2014 at a political event in New Hampshire. In January 2015, six months before Trump announced his campaign, Lewandowski was invited to Trump Tower, where he accepted an offer from Trump to become campaign manager. His salary was $20,000 per month.

When Lewandowski was hired, Trump's political staff consisted of three people: his lawyer Michael D. Cohen, veteran operative Roger Stone, and aide Sam Nunberg. In April 2016, another veteran GOP operative, Paul Manafort, was hired; the following month Manafort was named “campaign chairman.” Nunberg was fired in early August 2015; he believes that it was Lewandowski and campaign press secretary Hope Hicks who asked Trump for his ouster. Stone left the campaign a week later.

Lewandowski's motto as Trump's campaign manager was "Let Trump be Trump"; those words appeared on his office white board. Trump said of Lewandowski, "He leaves me alone, but he knows when to make his presence felt."

Lewandowski was identified in the George Papadopoulos court documents as the "High-Ranking Campaign Official".

After a win in New Hampshire on February 9, 2016, Trump acknowledged Lewandowski's role in the win by praising his ground game.

Physical incidents

Grabbing of reporter
On March 10, 2016, Michelle Fields, a reporter for Breitbart News, wrote that, after she asked Donald Trump a question when she approached him after a March 8, 2016, press conference in Jupiter, Florida, she was forcefully grabbed by Lewandowski. On March 29, Lewandowski was charged with one count of simple battery by the Jupiter Police Department and surrendered himself to the authorities, after releasing a statement maintaining his innocence.

Two weeks later, Palm Beach County State Attorney Dave Aronberg said that his office would not prosecute Lewandowski; they believed that "there was probable cause to make an arrest" and "the facts support the allegation that Mr. Lewandowski did grab Ms. Fields' arm against her will," but "the evidence cannot prove all legally required elements of the crime alleged and is insufficient to support a criminal prosecution."

Grabbing of protestor
On March 19, 2016, during a campaign event in Tucson, Arizona, Lewandowski drew criticism for his handling of a protester. Although a video showed Lewandowski grabbing the protester by the collar, the campaign and Lewandowski denied doing so.

2021 Las Vegas allegations
In September 2021, Lewandowski attended a charity dinner at the Westgate Las Vegas hotel. Another attendee at the dinner, Trashelle Odom, the wife of major Trump donor John Odom, accused Lewandowski of making unwanted sexual advances to her during the dinner, including "repeatedly touching her, including on her leg and buttocks, and speaking to her in sexually graphic terms."  Odom alleged that Lewandowski "stalked" her throughout the hotel that hosted the event; witnesses said that Lewandowski appeared intoxicated. In September 2022, Lewandowski was charged with misdemeanor battery in Clark County, Nevada court in connection with the incident. The same month, Lewandowski made a plea agreement in which he did not admit wrongdoing, but agreed to pay a $1,000 fine, serve 50 hours of community service, and take eight hours of "impulse control counseling"; if he fulfills the agreement and avoids legal trouble for a year, the charge against him will be dismissed.

Departure 
In April 2016, Lewandowski's influence within the Trump campaign was reported to be waning.

On June 20, 2016, Trump's campaign announced that it was parting ways with Lewandowski; according to reports, Lewandowski was fired, although Donald Trump Jr., Trump's son, described the split as "amicable." The move occurred after Lewandowski clashed with Trump chief strategist and campaign chairman Paul Manafort in an internal "power struggle." After Lewandowski's departure, Manafort (who had been brought on the campaign in March 2016) became the de facto campaign manager.

Political commentator and lobbyist

Involvement with Donald Trump

According to the Mueller Report, Lewandowski had a "close" relationship with President Donald Trump, whom Lewandowski was a "devotee" of.

On June 19, 2017, Lewandowski (a private citizen) joined President Trump in the Oval Office for a one-on-one meeting. Trump told Lewandowski that he would not have appointed Attorney General Jeff Sessions if he had known that Sessions would recuse himself from the investigation into Russia and the Trump campaign. Trump dictated to Lewandowski a statement that Sessions should make, which would have stated that Trump did nothing wrong, and limited the special counsel investigation into future election interference only. Lewandowski arranged for Sessions to visit him because he did not want to be publicly recorded visiting the Department of Justice. Sessions canceled the meeting due to a last minute conflict. After Lewandowski left Washington D.C., he asked White House official Rick Dearborn if he could pass a message to Sessions, without stating the contents of the message. Dearborn agreed. Lewandowski did so as he felt Dearborn was working in the government and had a better relationship with Sessions than he had.

On June 19, 2017, Lewandowski again met Trump one-on-one in the Oval Office. Trump inquired if Lewandowski passed the message to Sessions. Lewandowski replied that it would be done soon. Trump declared that if Sessions would not meet Lewandowski, Lewandowski should tell Sessions that Sessions was fired. Right after the meeting, Lewandowski gave Trump's message to Dearborn to pass to Sessions. Dearborn told Lewandowski he had 'handled the situation', but he actually deliberately did not deliver the message.

In April 2018, Lewandowski was interviewed as part of the special counsel investigation with regard to whether Trump had committed obstruction of justice, where he recounted the events above.

In February 2019, Lewandowski was interviewed by MSNBC, where he said: "I don't ever remember the president ever asking me to get involved with Jeff Sessions or the Department of Justice in any way, shape or form ever."

In September 2019, Lewandowski was called to testify in front of the House Judiciary Committee. Asked to explain his discrepancy in what he told Mueller and what he told the media above, Lewandowski stated: "I have no obligation to be honest with the media because they're just as dishonest as anyone else."

Acting Secretary of Defense Christopher Miller appointed Lewandowski to the Defense Business Board in December 2020. The Pentagon later prevented Lewandowski from being seated and then Defense Secretary Lloyd Austin fired Lewandoswski as part of a purge of the Pentagon's advisory boards to derail Trump's last-minute installation of political loyalists.

CNN
Days after Lewandowski left the Trump campaign, he was hired by the cable news network CNN as a political commentator. Lewandowski remains subject to a non-disclosure agreement that he signed with Trump, forbidding him "from making disparaging or revealing remarks about the candidate." Lewandowski received severance pay from the Trump campaign while working for CNN. In July 2016, after the group Media Matters for America noted that CNN had not disclosed this to viewers, CNN hosts began making on-air disclosures of the severance payments before Lewandowski's appearances.

In July 2016, Lewandowski defended Trump who had been criticized after tweeting a graphic that labeled Hillary Clinton the "most corrupt candidate" alongside a pile of cash and a six-pointed star evoking the Star of David. (The image originated on an Internet message board featuring antisemitic conspiracy theories). During an appearance on CNN's State of the Union with Brianna Keilar, Lewandowski denied allegations of antisemitism and said that criticism of the tweet was "political correctness run amok."

In an August 2016 appearance on CNN, Lewandowski espoused the "birther" conspiracy theory, suggesting that President Barack Obama was not a natural-born-citizen of the United States. Lewandowski's statement was criticized by the other panelists, Angela Rye and Bakari Sellers.

On November 11, 2016, Lewandowski resigned as a CNN commentator amid speculations that he would play a role in the Trump administration.

Fox Business Network

Drunk Live on Air incident
On October 2, 2019, Lewandowski appeared in an interview on Fox Business Network in which he appeared to repeatedly slur his words. The host, Lisa Kennedy Montgomery, asked Lewandowski, "Corey?...Did you have merlot with dinner?" before Lewandowski replied "No, should I have?". Kennedy quickly ended the interview and thanked Lewandowski, adding: "Maybe, a cup of coffee."

OANN
After leaving CNN, Lewandowski worked as a political commentator for the cable news television channel One America News Network (OANN). While he mainly worked for OANN, he made sporadic appearances on Fox News. Lewandowski was fired from OANN on July 31, 2017, for appearing on news networks outside of OANN.

Avenue Strategies
On December 21, 2016, Lewandowski and Barry Bennett, a "former Trump senior adviser", whom Lewandowski had known for ten years, co-founded as equal partners a political consulting firm called Avenue Strategies. They were joined by other Trump presidential campaign veterans. Bennett, Mike Rubino, Jason Osborne, and most of Lewandowski's associates at Avenue Strategies filed lobbying registrations.

Mainly because of Lewandowski, Avenue Strategies soon became one of "the highest-profile government-affairs outfits in Washington". Avenue Strategies' office "overlooks the White House", and Lewandowski has "relatively unimpeded access" to President Trump either by phone or in person at the White House. Access to President Trump can be "highly lucrative" — "relatively few established K Street powerhouses have ties to the new president".

In February 2017, Avenue Strategies "quietly agreed" to lobby for Citgo Petroleum Corporation (Citgo). In April they signed a $25,000 a month contract as tensions mounted between the United States, Venezuela, and Russia. Citgo is headquartered in Houston, Texas, but is owned by the government of Venezuela. Citgo took out a loan from Russian state-owned oil giant Rosneft in December 2016 that it has been unable to pay. It is under threat of a takeover by Rosneft. By early May the legally required paperwork had not been filed revealing the contract to the U.S. Government through the Senate Office of Public Records.

The governor of debt-ridden Puerto Rico hired Avenue Strategies to lobby Congress for funding. Avenue Strategies also "operates a fledgling super PAC to help Trump win re-election".

According to The New York Times, the firm's corporate clients — Fortune 100 companies — hire them as insurance against "tweet risk". Bennett said, "If he’s gonna come after you, there’s nothing we can do to stop it. But if you want to figure out how to win in this environment, we can help you. [For example], [c]all Jared Kushner and tell him you’re gonna build a new factory," or invite Mr. Trump to "fly somewhere, cut a ribbon, and high-five 200 employees... [That] "drives optimism, and it drives his power. There are few things a president can do to build power faster than to lead a great economic comeback." Lewandowski added, "We’re your sherpa through turbulent times." While at the firm, Lewandowski won a $160,000 account with Community Choice Financial, a large payday lender.

Lewandowski did not formally register as a lobbyist as he did not consider himself to be a lobbyist. However, he was criticized by "competing lobbyists and ethics watchdogs" for "flouting the spirit of the lobbying rules, and abusing his access to the Trump White House". On May 3, 2017, Public Citizen, a "government-ethics group, asked the U.S. Department of Justice to investigate whether Lewandowski should have registered as a foreign or domestic lobbyist".

On May 4, 2017, Lewandowski left Avenue Strategies.

Washington East West Political Strategies
In an article published on April 28, 2017 POLITICO revealed that they had obtained documents about Washington East West Political Strategies — an "affiliate of Avenue Strategies". It was one of "several international recruitment vehicles" through which business partners globally — including those in the Middle East, Canada, and Central America — could "earn commissions by enlisting international clients" for Avenue Strategies. East West solicited "business in Eastern Europe and elsewhere by offering access to Trump, Vice President Mike Pence and other top administration officials". The documents described "numerous proposed activities that would seem to trigger Foreign Agents Registration Act (FARA) registration". East West was created by Lewandowski, Bennett, Rauf Mammadov, "an Azerbaijani oil executive and an American political consultant who works extensively in Russia", Marshall Comins, who "worked extensively in the former Soviet Union and Sub-Saharan Africa consulting governments, high net-worth individuals and politicians", Jeff Monson, a "prominent figure in Russia’s Communist Party", and Mike Nicholas Sango, "Zimbabwe's ambassador to Russia." On May 3 Avenue Strategies dissolved East West with Bennett and Lewandowski both claiming that their collaborators, Mammadov and Comins, had issued the East West document, not them. Bennett explained that "Avenue Strategies owned the equity — and that is me and Corey — but he didn’t have any role....[I]t is a "violation of our understanding with them." Lewandowski said he had "no affiliation or involvement" and "never entered into any agreement with [East West]."

Lewandowski Strategic Advisors
On May 12, 2017, eight days after leaving Avenue Strategies, Lewandowski incorporated Lewandowski Strategic Advisors in Delaware, which, as an advisory firm, does not register as a lobbyist or disclose its clients. He then sought to recruit David Bossie and George Gigicos.

In July 2017, Community Choice Financial, a payday lender, offered Lewandowski a $20,000-a-month retainer. On the July 30, 2017 episode of Meet the Press, Lewandowski told President Trump to fire Richard Cordray, the Director of the Consumer Financial Protection Bureau; Cordray had led efforts to enact new payday lending regulations. When Chuck Todd then asked Lewandowski if he was advocating for a client, Lewandowski replied "No, No. I have no clients whatsoever".

Turnberry Solutions LLC
Lewandoski was reported to be working as a lobbyist for Turnberry Solutions LLC, though he denied having any involvement with the firm.

U.S. Military Base in Poland
In 2018, Lewandowski and Jill Kelley, a former U.S. diplomatic and national security advisor, had a meeting with the Polish government to set up a U.S. military base in Poland, called "Fort Trump," with Poland paying for all the costs, to improve their national security and gain better relations with the U.S. military and Trump administration.

Memoir
In December 2017, the memoir Let Trump Be Trump, co-authored by Lewandowski and David Bossie, was published by Center Street. The memoir chronicles Lewandowski's and Bossie's experiences working for Donald Trump's 2016 presidential campaign.

Mocking of an immigrant child with Down syndrome
On June 19, 2018, Lewandowski appeared on Fox News alongside Democratic strategist Zac Petkanas. When Petkanas mentioned a case of a 10-year-old immigrant girl with Down syndrome who had been forcibly taken away from her mother under the Trump administration family separation policy and allegedly put in a cage, Lewandowski responded "womp, womp" (an onomatopoeia for the "sad trombone" sound effect that often accompanies a comedic failure), which angered Petkanas and received widespread criticism from various sources. Former Fox News contributor Meghan McCain commented: "This is so horrible, even by Lewandowski standards." Appearing on Fox News on June 20, Lewandowski refused to apologize for the remark and instead reiterated his belief that undocumented aliens are criminals who should be held accountable.

On June 20, 2018, Lewandowski was dropped by Leading Authorities, Inc., a speakers bureau based in Washington D.C.

On June 27, 2018, Lewandowski revisited the topic of the 10-year-old immigrant on CNN, asserting, contrary to the available evidence, that the "10-year-old that was separated at the border was separated because her mother was a member—or a potential member—of a child-smuggling ring.” However, U.S. Customs and Border Protection said she was a "material witness", not being charged with illegal entry.

Potential 2020 United States Senate campaign

On August 1, 2019, Lewandowski announced in a statement to New Hampshire ABC-affiliate WMUR that he was "very seriously" considering seeking the Republican nomination to oppose incumbent Democratic Senator Jeanne Shaheen in the 2020 U.S. Senate election in New Hampshire. This announcement closely followed a report of ongoing attempts by the Republican National Committee to draft Lewandowski to seek the seat.

At a Donald Trump 2020 presidential campaign rally in Manchester, New Hampshire on August 15, Trump praised Lewandowski and encouraged him to enter the race. Lewandowski, in the audience, declined to make a statement about his candidacy.

On August 18, Lewandowski said in an interview on WNYM, a New York-based conservative talk radio station, that he was still considering a run and added that "if I get into this race, I’m going to win.

On October 1, Lewandowski said he was reconsidering and might not run.

On December 31, 2019, Lewandowski announced he would not run for Senate in New Hampshire saying, "After much consideration I have decided to forgo a campaign for the US Senate," in a tweet. He also said in the tweet, "I am certain I would have won".

Personal life
Lewandowski met his future wife Alison Hardy when he was in ninth grade and she was in eighth grade. In 1998, Hardy married Brian Kinney, who was killed onboard United Airlines Flight 175 on September 11, 2001. Four years later, in 2005, Lewandowski married Hardy. Together they have four children. 

On November 28, 2017, a pro-Trump performer, Joy Villa, filed a police complaint against Lewandowski for allegedly slapping her buttocks at a holiday party at the Trump Hotel in Washington, D.C. Villa alleged that after she told him that she could report him for sexual harassment, Lewandowski said, "I work in the private sector" and slapped her again. Lewandowski responded to the allegations by saying that "There is a due process and there is a process which they will go through to determine a person's innocence."

Lewandowski is a Catholic. He lives in Windham, New Hampshire, but primarily works in Manchester, New Hampshire when not in Washington, D.C.

In 2018, Lewandowski featured in Sacha Baron Cohen's prank comedy series Who Is America?, discussing the presidency and views of Donald Trump with Baron Cohen's alter-ego, conspiracy theorist Billy Wayne Ruddick Jr.

In September 2021, Lewandowski was removed from his role as chairman of a super PAC called Make America Great Again Action after reports of sexual harassment accusations from a donor.

Electoral history

1994

2012

References

External links

1973 births
American campaign managers
American lobbyists
American political commentators
American people of French-Canadian descent
American people of Polish descent
American University alumni
Catholics from Massachusetts
CNN people
Donald Trump 2016 presidential campaign
Living people
Massachusetts Republicans
New Hampshire Republicans
People associated with the 2016 United States presidential election
People from Lowell, Massachusetts
United States congressional aides
University of Massachusetts Lowell alumni